The Shoppes at EastChase is the principal retail component of the EastChase mixed-use development located in Montgomery, Alabama at the intersection of Interstate 85 and Taylor Road on the east side of the city. The Shoppes at EastChase was the catalyst in attracting higher-end national and regional retailers to the Montgomery metropolitan area and the Central Alabama region.

The lifestyle center itself opened November 2002, with numerous in-line tenants, including Talbot's, Ann Taylor, The Gap and Banana Republic, while the anchor retailer, Dillard's, opened a two-level  store March 2004. This store replaced one at Montgomery Mall.

An outparcel was developed for home furnishings retailer Rooms To Go, which opened a  store south of the main entrance drive. There are several casual dining facilities in the Shoppes at EastChase, including Bonefish Grill and Zoës Kitchen.

In August 2016, it was announced that fast fashion retailer H&M will develop a 22,000 square foot junior anchor space in the lifestyle center component of EastChase. By June 2017, original tenants Banana Republic, Ann Taylor and Williams-Sonoma closed their EastChase locations in order to create retail space for the retailer.

Expected to open during fall, Eastchase is extending a new area to include a relocated Best Buy, Burlington, Panda Express, Bad Daddy’s Burger Bar, Jersey Mike’s Subs and Great Clips.

Two additional open-air power and convenience centers complement the retail component of the EastChase development: The  Plaza At EastChase and the larger  EastChase Market Center. The Plaza At EastChase is tenanted with (then) new to the market big box stores such as Target, World Market, Kohl's and PetSmart. EastChase Market Center features numerous big box retailers and eateries that have relocated from declining strip mall locations along nearby East Boulevard, among them Bed Bath & Beyond(now closed) and Michaels arts and crafts supply store. Wholesale warehouse club Costco operates a location adjacent to EastChase Market Center.

Originally developed by Jim Wilson and Associates, The Shoppes At EastChase is currently owned by JPMorgan Chase and managed by Crawford Square Real Estate Advisors.

References

Shopping malls in Alabama
Economy of Montgomery, Alabama
Tourist attractions in Montgomery, Alabama
Buildings and structures in Montgomery, Alabama
Shopping malls established in 2002
2002 establishments in Alabama